Ghost Management Group, LLC is a technology company based in Irvine, California. that has a portfolio of advertising, web, point of sale and logistics software.

Overview
The firm was founded in 2012 by Justin Hartfield and Doug Francis.

Ghost Group targets accredited businesses and investors that are either already involved or have shown interest in becoming involved in the marijuana industry.

In June 2013 the firm announced the launch of Emerald Ocean Capital fund. The market of consumer-facing products, especially software and technologies, will be the focus of Emerald Ocean. After announcing the launch of the fund, Emerald Ocean expressed intentions of raising 10 to 25 million dollars in its first round.

Additionally, the capital fund will function as a venture capital incubator, with an 8,000 square foot office facility in Denver, Colorado for select startups.

Ghost Group concurrently announced the launch of Ghost Domain Capital, an investor in category killer Internet domains.

Developments in marijuana legalization
Both Emerald Ocean Capital and Ghost Domain Capital were launched after a Pew Research Center study found that more than 50% of Americans approve the legalization of marijuana for recreational use.

In 2005 a United Nations study reported global marijuana sales generate 142 billion dollars.

Justin Hartfield resides on the boards of both the NORML and the Marijuana Policy Project’s Boards of Directors. He contributed over $100,000 to the Measure F campaign, which advocates for an open market system for marijuana sales.

References

External links
 Official website

Venture capital firms of the United States
Financial services companies based in California
Companies based in Newport Beach, California
American companies established in 2012
Financial services companies established in 2012
2012 establishments in California